Centre of Communist Revolutionaries of India was formed in 1988 through the merger of the Anand and Harbhajan Sohi factions of UCCRI(ML), CPI(ML) Chandrashekar group, Revolutionary Communist Party and Organizing Committee, CPI(ML). The initiative was taken by the two UCCRI(ML) splinter groups.

In August 1994 CCRI merged with the Punjab section of CPI(ML) Central Team, Communist Unity Centre of India and Marxist-Leninist Organising Centre to form the Communist Party Reorganisation Centre of India (Marxist-Leninist).

Defunct communist parties in India
Political schisms
Political parties established in 1988
1988 establishments in India
Political parties disestablished in 1994
1994 disestablishments in India